Morten Breum (born 26 May 1982), better known by his artist name Morten, is a Danish DJ and producer.

His professional music career started with his first track "Højere Vildere" with Rune RK, featuring the Danish duo Nik & Jay in 2008, but his track "Domestic" in 2010 was his breakthrough track, reaching No. 3 on the Danish Singles Chart. In 2009, he released his album Drop!, followed by Nightclub Session in 2010. With a string of releases since then, Morten has explored the genre of "future rave".

Biography 
Morten has played festivals around the world solo and in collaboration with French DJ and producer David Guetta. The two close friends coined the future rave genre, releasing a four-track collaborative EP in 2020 titled New Rave. Morten has gathered an audience of 4.7 million monthly listeners on Spotify. In 2021, Morten entered the DJ Mag Top 100 as highest new entry at number 39, and landed at number 20 on the 1001Tracklists ranking. In 2022, his music video for "Dreams" with David Guetta and featuring Lanie Garnder won Best Highlight Video at Clubbing TV's Music Video Awards. In 2022 he played the mainstage at EDC Las Vegas and Tomorrowland, as well as a residency in Ibiza with Guetta.

Morten has performed at some of the biggest festivals worldwide including Ultra Music Festival, EDC Las Vegas, Sunset Music Festival, Tomorrowland, Creamfields, and EDC Orlando.

Future rave 

Since 2019, David Guetta and Morten have explored a dance music sound known as "future rave". Emerging from their desire to play something new in their sets, the duo intends to bring the elements of both the EDM and underground scenes together, combining the energy and the hooks of EDM, the futuristic sounds of techno and the emotion of trance and (future) house.

David Guetta commented on their collaboration in a Billboard interview: "Morten came with this sound, and it's so hard to find a new sound. Then I have more experience in making chords and melodies and structuring records, so it's been really interesting to be able to kind of complete each other. I think what we're doing doesn't sound like anyone else. It's really fresh and new and I'm so excited about it. DJs I play it for are excited about it too. I haven't been excited about dance music like this for a long time."

In 2022, the pair went on a US tour including a set at EDC under the title Future Rave.

Hï Ibiza Future Rave residency 
On 8 April 2022, David Guetta and Morten announced that they would have an 18-week residency at the club Hï Ibiza on the island of Ibiza in mid-2022.

Rankings and awards 
 2021 – No. 39 on DJ Mag Top 100
 2021 – No. 20 on 1001Tracklists Top 101 DJs
 2021 – ClubbingTV Best Highlight Music Video for "Dreams" with David Guetta
 2022 – No. 28 on 1001Tracklists Top 101 DJs

Discography

Albums
 Drop! (2009)
 Nightclub Session (2010)

Extended plays
 New Rave with David Guetta (2020)

Singles

As featured artist

Free downloads 
 "Ballet Only" (2012)
 "Liquids" (2011)
 "Wreck" (2014)

Remixes 
2008: Højere Vildere (Skru Op For Den Bitch) (MORTEN Radio Edit)
2015: Adele — "Hello" (MORTEN Remix)
2015: MORTEN - Himalaya (MORTEN & Big N Slim Rework) [Armada Trice] 
2019: Avicii — "Heaven" (David Guetta and MORTEN Remix)
2020: David Guetta — "Let's Love" (David Guetta and MORTEN Future Rave Remix)
2021: David Guetta featuring Sia - "Titanium" (David Guetta and MORTEN Future Rave Remix)

References

External links
Official website

1982 births
Living people
People from Aarhus
Danish record producers
Danish DJs
Electronic dance music DJs